Yangsan Jin clan  is one of the Korean clans, founded around the Yuan dynasty. Their Bon-gwan is in Liangshan County, Shandong, China. Their founder was Chen Pucai who was originally from Mount Liang (Liangsan / Yangsan), China.

Founder Chen Pucai 
Chen worked as a civil servant in Yuan dynasty but lived in retirement. After his demise, he was awarded Imperial Chancellor and given the posthumous name, Wenlie during Ming dynasty period. 

Chen Pucai had a son named Chen Youliang, who fought against Yuan government and became the first emperor of the Chen Han. 

The younger son of Chen Youliang named Chen Li, succeeded as second emperor of Chen Han. 

After surrender to Ming dynasty, 
Emperor Hongwu appointed Chen Li as Marquis of Guide. He was later sent to Korea, where he became known as King Chen. King Gongmin gave nine bamboo cloths (苎布) to Chen Li. Chen Li passed away due to illness but is survived by his descendants in Korea and the Yangsan Jin Clan. One of Chen Li's (known) sons was Chen Mingshan (陈明善).

See also 
 Chen Han, origin of the clan and dynasty in China
 Korean clan names

References

External links 
 

 
Korean clan names of Chinese origin
Jin clans